The G14 is a proposed plan that will add six emerging economies to the G8+5 group. Egypt will be part of the G14. The plan was announced in 2008 when France and Italy advocated for expansion.

Current leaders

See also
Newly industrialized country
G8+5

Notes

References

G7 summits